In number theory, a full reptend prime, full repetend prime, proper prime or long prime in base b is an odd prime number p such that the Fermat quotient

 

(where p does not divide b) gives a cyclic number. The cyclic number corresponding to prime p will possess p − 1 digits if and only if p is a full reptend prime. That is, the multiplicative order  = p − 1, which is equivalent to b being a primitive root modulo p.

The term "long prime" was used by John Conway and Richard Guy in their Book of Numbers. Confusingly, Sloane's OEIS refers to these primes as "cyclic numbers".

Base 10 

Base 10 may be assumed if no base is specified, in which case the expansion of the number is called a repeating decimal. In base 10, if a full reptend prime ends in the digit 1, then each digit 0, 1, ..., 9 appears in the reptend the same number of times as each other digit. (For such primes in base 10, see . In fact, in base b, if a full reptend prime ends in the digit 1, then each digit 0, 1, ..., b − 1 appears in the repetend the same number of times as each other digit, but no such prime exists when b = 12, since every full reptend prime in base 12 ends in the digit 5 or 7 in the same base. Generally, no such prime exists when b is congruent to 0 or 1 modulo 4.

The values of p for which this formula produces cyclic numbers in decimal are: 
 7, 17, 19, 23, 29, 47, 59, 61, 97, 109, 113, 131, 149, 167, 179, 181, 193, 223, 229, 233, 257, 263, 269, 313, 337, 367, 379, 383, 389, 419, 433, 461, 487, 491, 499, 503, 509, 541, 571, 577, 593, 619, 647, 659, 701, 709, 727, 743, 811, 821, 823, 857, 863, 887, 937, 941, 953, 971, 977, 983, 1019, 1021, 1033, 1051... 

For example, the case b = 10, p = 7 gives the cyclic number 142857; thus 7 is a full reptend prime. Furthermore, 1 divided by 7 written out in base 10 is 

The case b = 10, p = 17 gives the cyclic number 0588235294117647; thus 17 is a full reptend prime. Furthermore, 1 divided by 17 written out in base 10 is 

The case b = 10, p = 19 gives the cyclic number 052631578947368421; thus 19 is a full reptend prime. Furthermore, 1 divided by 19 written out in base 10 is 

Not all values of p will yield a cyclic number using this formula; for example, p = 13 gives  These failed cases will always contain a repetition of digits (possibly several) over the course of p − 1 digits.

p = 31 gives  These failed cases will always contain a repetition of digits (possibly several) over the course of p − 1 digits.

The known pattern to this sequence comes from algebraic number theory, specifically, this sequence is the set of primes p such that 10 is a primitive root modulo p. Artin's conjecture on primitive roots is that this sequence contains 37.395...% of the primes.

Patterns of occurrence of full reptend primes
Advanced modular arithmetic can show that any prime of the following forms:

40k + 1
40k + 3
40k + 9
40k + 13
40k + 27
40k + 31
40k + 37
40k + 39

can never be a full reptend prime in base 10. The first primes of these forms, with their periods, are:

However, studies show that two-thirds of primes of the form 40k + n, where n ∈ {7, 11, 17, 19, 21, 23, 29, 33} are full reptend primes. For some sequences, the preponderance of full reptend primes is much greater. For instance, 285 of the 295 primes of form 120k + 23 below 100000 are full reptend primes, with 20903 being the first that is not full reptend.

Binary full reptend primes
In base 2, the full reptend primes are: (less than 1000)
3, 5, 11, 13, 19, 29, 37, 53, 59, 61, 67, 83, 101, 107, 131, 139, 149, 163, 173, 179, 181, 197, 211, 227, 269, 293, 317, 347, 349, 373, 379, 389, 419, 421, 443, 461, 467, 491, 509, 523, 541, 547, 557, 563, 587, 613, 619, 653, 659, 661, 677, 701, 709, 757, 773, 787, 797, 821, 827, 829, 853, 859, 877, 883, 907, 941, 947, ... 

For these primes, 2 is a primitive root modulo p, so 2n modulo p can be any natural number between 1 and p − 1.

 
The randomness of these sequences has been examined by diehard tests.

Further, all safe primes congruent to 3 modulo 8 are full reptend primes in base 2. For example, 3, 11, 59, 83, 107, 179, 227, 347, 467, 563, 587, 1019, 1187, 1283, 1307, 1523, 1619, 1907, etc. (less than 2000).

Binary full reptend prime sequences (also called maximum-length decimal sequences) have found cryptographic and error-correction coding applications. In these applications, repeating decimals to base 2 are generally used which gives rise to binary sequences.

The following is a list about the periods (in binary) to the primes congruent to 1 or 7 (mod 8): (less than 1000)

None of them are binary full reptend primes.

The binary period of n-th prime are
 2, 4, 3, 10, 12, 8, 18, 11, 28, 5, 36, 20, 14, 23, 52, 58, 60, 66, 35, 9, 39, 82, 11, 48, 100, 51, 106, 36, 28, 7, 130, 68, 138, 148, 15, 52, 162, 83, 172, 178, 180, 95, 96, 196, 99, 210, 37, 226, 76, 29, 119, 24, 50, 16, 131, 268, 135, 92, 70, 94, 292, 102, 155, 156, 316, 30, 21, 346, 348, 88, 179, 183, 372, 378, 191, 388, 44, ... (this sequence starts at n = 2, or the prime = 3) 

The binary period level of n-th prime are
 1, 1, 2, 1, 1, 2, 1, 2, 1, 6, 1, 2, 3, 2, 1, 1, 1, 1, 2, 8, 2, 1, 8, 2, 1, 2, 1, 3, 4, 18, 1, 2, 1, 1, 10, 3, 1, 2, 1, 1, 1, 2, 2, 1, 2, 1, 6, 1, 3, 8, 2, 10, 5, 16, 2, 1, 2, 3, 4, 3, 1, 3, 2, 2, 1, 11, 16, 1, 1, 4, 2, 2, 1, 1, 2, 1, 9, 2, 2, 1, 1, 10, 6, 6, 1, 2, 6, 1, 2, 1, 2, 2, 1, 3, 2, 1, 2, 1, 1, ... 

However, studies show that three-fourths of primes of the form 8k + n, where n ∈ {3, 5} are full reptend primes in base 2 (For example, there are 87 primes below 1000 congruent to 3 or 5 modulo 8, and 67 of them are full-reptend in base 2, it is total 77%). For some sequences, the preponderance of full reptend primes is much greater. For instance, 1078 of the 1206 primes of form 24k + 5 below 100000 are full reptend primes in base 2, with 1013 being the first that is not full reptend in base 2. Furthermore, all primes of the form 4p + 1 for p is prime are full-reptend primes in base 2.

n-th level reptend prime

In base 10, smallest n-th level reptend prime are

7, 3, 103, 53, 11, 79, 211, 41, 73, 281, 353, 37, 2393, 449, 3061, 1889, 137, 2467, 16189, 641, 3109, 4973, 11087, 1321, 101, 7151, 7669, 757, 38629, 1231, 49663, 12289, 859, 239, 27581, 9613, 18131, 13757, 33931, 9161, 118901, 6763, 18233, 1409, 88741, 4003, 5171, 19489, 86143, 23201, ... 

In base 2, smallest n-th level reptend prime are

3, 7, 43, 113, 251, 31, 1163, 73, 397, 151, 331, 1753, 4421, 631, 3061, 257, 1429, 127, 6043, 3121, 29611, 1321, 18539, 601, 15451, 14327, 2971, 2857, 72269, 3391, 683, 2593, 17029, 2687, 42701, 11161, 13099, 1103, 71293, 13121, 17467, 2143, 83077, 25609, 5581, 5153, 26227, 2113, 51941, 2351, ...

Full reptend primes in various bases

Artin also conjectured:
 There are infinitely many full-reptend primes in all bases except squares.
 Full-reptend primes in all bases except perfect powers and numbers whose squarefree part are congruent to 1 modulo 4 comprise 37.395...% of all primes. (See )

The smallest full-reptend primes in base n are:
2, 3, 2, 0, 2, 11, 2, 3, 2, 7, 2, 5, 2, 3, 2, 0, 2, 5, 2, 3, 2, 5, 2, 7, 2, 3, 2, 5, 2, 11, 2, 3, 2, 19, 2, 0, 2, 3, 2, 7, 2, 5, 2, 3, 2, 11, 2, 5, 2, 3, 2, 5, 2, 7, 2, 3, 2, 5, 2, 19, 2, 3, 2, 0, 2, 7, 2, 3, 2, 19, 2, 5, 2, 3, 2, 13, 2, 5, 2, 3, 2, 5, 2, 11, 2, 3, 2, 5, 2, 11, 2, 3, 2, 7, 2, 7, 2, 3, 2, 0, ...

See also
Repeating decimal

References

Conway, J. H. and Guy, R. K. The Book of Numbers. New York: Springer-Verlag, 1996.
Francis, Richard L.; "Mathematical Haystacks: Another Look at Repunit Numbers"; in The College Mathematics Journal, Vol. 19, No. 3. (May, 1988), pp. 240–246.

Classes of prime numbers